Pupisoma sp. nov. 1 is an undescribed species of minute land snail, a terrestrial pulmonate gastropod mollusc or micromollusk in the family Valloniidae. This species is endemic to Nicaragua and was classified as near threatened in 1996, but no other information is given by the IUCN.

References

Endemic fauna of Nicaragua
Molluscs of Central America
sp. nov.
Undescribed gastropod species
Taxonomy articles created by Polbot